Kostolné Kračany is a village and municipality in the Dunajská Streda District in the Trnava Region of south-west Slovakia.

Component villages 
The village also administers 5 other villages:

Geography
The municipality lies at an altitude of 119 metres, 5 km southwest of Dunajská Streda, and covers an area of 13.916 km².

History
In the 11th century, the territory of Kostolné Kračany became part of the Kingdom of Hungary. In historical records the village was first mentioned in 1215 as Corcha. Its first church was consecrated to Saint Bartholomew before 1249. However, the settlement is considered to originate from the era of the Hungarian conquest of the Carpathian Basin as the structure of the village reflects the ecclesiastical system as organised by King St Stephen of Hungary. The king ordered that all 10 villages must build a church, the villages named Karcha build the church in this village whose name in Hungarian means Church Karcha.

In the 14th century, it consisted  of the following villages: Egyházaskarcha (1351), Remegkarcha (1355), Diákkarcha (1357), Barthalkarcha (1377) Lászlókarcha (1377) és Lucakarcha (1467). In 1561, the people of the village converted to the Protestant Reformed church, and only in 1729 was the Catholic congregation re-established. During the 16th and 17th centuries, the village was under the patronage of the Somogyi family. The population, 62 in 1840, grew to 80 by 1910. Ethnically, the population was predominantly Hungarian. Until the Treaty of Trianon, it was part of Pozsony county.

Demography 
According to the 2001 census, its total population was 1162, including 1078 ethnic Hungarians (92,77%) and 64 ethnic Slovaks (5,51%). As of December 31, 2008 the estimated resident population was 1293.

See also
 List of municipalities and towns in Slovakia

References

Genealogical resources

The records for genealogical research are available at the state archive "Statny Archiv in Bratislava, Slovakia"
 Roman Catholic church records (births/marriages/deaths): 1673-1935 (parish A)

External links
Slovakian Statistical Bureau
Surnames of living people in Kostolne Kracany

Villages and municipalities in Dunajská Streda District
Hungarian communities in Slovakia